Valkova is a rural locality (a village) in Verkh-Invenskoye Rural Settlement, Kudymkarsky District, Perm Krai, Russia. The population was 20 as of 2010. There is 1 street.

Geography 
Valkova is located 41 km west of Kudymkar (the district's administrative centre) by road. Andriyanova is the nearest rural locality.

References 

Rural localities in Kudymkarsky District